Balestrand is a former municipality in Sogn og Fjordane county, Norway. It was located on the northern shore of the Sognefjorden in the traditional district of Sogn. The administrative center was the village of Balestrand. Other villages in the municipality included Ese, Kvamme, Låne, Sæle, Tjugum, and Vetlefjorden.

The municipality was situated at the confluence of the Fjærlandsfjorden/Esefjorden and the main Sognefjorden. The major industries in the municipality were tourism and farming. Balestrand became popular early due to the interest of artists, such as Hans Gude, Kjartan Lauritzen, Alfred Heaton Cooper, Hans Dahl, and Johannes Flintoe. Their paintings of the scenery around Balestrand inspired visitors, and Balestrand maintains its connection with art. Other industries include made-to-order kitchen interiors, local apple juice, and Nesseplast which produces industrial plastic. The Norwegian County Road 13 runs through the municipality.

At the time of its dissolution in 2020, the  municipality is the 231st largest by area out of the 422 municipalities in Norway. Balestrand is the 370th most populous municipality in Norway with a population of 1,272.

In 2016, the chief of police for Vestlandet formally suggested a reconfiguration of police districts and stations. He proposed that the police station in Balestrand be closed.

General information

Balestrand was established as a municipality in 1850 when the three sub-parishes of Vangsnes, Tjugum, and Mundal in the northwestern part of the large Leikanger municipality were separated to form the new municipality of Balestrand. The initial population of the municipality was 2,122. In 1861, the Mundal sub-parish was renamed Fjærland.

During the 1960s, there were many municipal mergers across Norway due to the work of the Schei Committee. On 1 January 1964 the municipalities of Vik, Leikanger, and Balestrand changed their boundaries in a land trade. The sub-parish of Vangsnes (population: 189) was transferred from Balestrand to Vik, Balestrand gained the sub-parish of Kvamsøy (population: 389) from Vik, and Leikanger gained the Hella-Eitorn area (population: 31) from Balestrand. Balestrand had a population of 1,606 after the changes were completed.

The Fjærland area of Balestrand had always been isolated from the rest of the municipality, and only accessible by boat. In 1995, the Frudal Tunnel was completed connecting Fjærland to neighboring Sogndal municipality (not to the rest of Balestrand). This caused discussions about Fjærland's municipal future. On 1 January 2000, the entire sub-parish of Fjærland in northern Balestrand was transferred to Sogndal municipality.

On 1 January 2020, Balestrand Municipality ceased to exist. The far western Nesse area of Balestrand was transferred to the neighboring Høyanger Municipality and the rest of Balestrand was merged with the neighboring municipalities of Leikanger and Sogndal to form a much larger municipality called Sogndal.

Name
The compounded name Balestrand was created in 1832 by the Norwegian writer Henrik Wergeland. The first element is the name of the old farm Bale and the last element is "strand" which means "beach". The name of the farm is identical with the word bali which means "hillside along a beach".

Coat of arms
The coat of arms was granted on 23 October 1989. It shows the silver-colored hilt of a Viking sword on a blue background.

Churches
The Church of Norway had one parish within the municipality of Balestrand. It was part of the Sogn prosti (deanery) in the Diocese of Bjørgvin.

There is also one Anglican church in Balestrand:
St. Olaf's Church (built in 1897) is located in the village of Balestrand.

Government
All municipalities in Norway, including Balestrand, are responsible for primary education (through 10th grade), outpatient health services, senior citizen services, unemployment and other social services, zoning, economic development, and municipal roads. The municipality is governed by a municipal council of elected representatives, which in turn elect a mayor.  The municipality falls under the Sogn og Fjordane District Court and the Gulating Court of Appeal.

Municipal council
The municipal council  of Balestrand is made up of 17 representatives that are elected to four year terms. The party breakdown of the final municipal council was as follows:

Mayor
The mayor (ordførar) of a municipality in Norway is a representative of the majority party of the municipal council who is elected to lead the council. Harald Offerdal of the Labour Party was elected mayor of Balestrand for the 2011–2015 term and re-elected to the 2015–2019 term.

Geography
Balestrand was located between the high snow-covered Gaularfjellet mountains in the center of the beautiful, lush Sognefjorden. Three fjord arms stretch inland, winding through the mountains and dotted with charming hamlets: Lånefjorden, Esefjorden, and Vetlefjorden. The Fjærlandsfjorden runs along the eastern border of the municipality. The Jostefonn glacier sits at the very northernmost part of the municipality.

Balestrand was bordered to the west by the municipalities of Høyanger and Gaular, to the north by Førde, and to the east by Sogndal and Leikanger. Across the Sognefjorden to the south is the municipality of Vik.

Attractions

Kvikne's Hotel
Built in the 19th century, the Kvikne's Hotel is one of the most famous buildings in Balestrand. The Kvikne family, who own the place, took it over in 1877. Since then the establishment has undergone constant development which continues to this day. There are many new buildings and remodeling and expansion projects have been carried out.

Today, the hotel is a highly modern facility resounding with tradition and culture. With 200 rooms, it is also one of Norway's largest fine hotels catering to tourists. An impressive collection of art and historical pieces is a central feature of the hotel's interior, and one of the elements of its distinct personality.

Kviknes Hotel was made popular for European visitors in the early part of the 20th century by Kaiser Wilhelm II, who often visited there during his summer vacations prior to World War I. The hotel still possesses the chair he used in their restaurant. The Kaiser is accompanied on the list by a number of emperors, kings, presidents, Prime ministers, film stars, and artists from many countries.

St. Olaf's Church

St. Olaf's Church, also known as the English Church, is an Anglican church built in the style of a Stave church. The church was completed in 1897 as a memorial to Margaret Green. Margaret, an English lady, came to the fjords as a tourist to hike the mountains. She met, fell in love with and married Knut Kvikne who was an avid mountain man. Being a very pious woman, she wished for an Anglican church in Balestrand. She started the church with her husband, but died before its completion. Sunday services are held during the summer months, being conducted by rotating vicars from England.

St. Olaf's Church is notable as the inspiration for the chapel in Elsa's coronation scene in the 2013 Disney film Frozen.

Other attractions
Songnefjord Aquarium
Balejazz summer jazz festival
Balestrand Art Village
The Norwegian Museum of Travel and Tourism

Notable people 
 Christian Garup Meidell (1780 in Balestrand – 1863) a military officer and politician; first Mayor of Leikanger, 1838/9
 Jakob Sverdrup (1845–1899) a Norwegian bishop and politician, raised in Balestrand
 Georg Sverdrup (1848 in Balestrand – 1907) a Norwegian-American Lutheran theologian and teacher
 Edvard Sverdrup (1861 in Balestrand – 1923) a Norwegian educator, author, church leader and a key theologian in the Church of Norway in early 20thC.
 Anders Johanneson Bøyum (1890 in Balestrand – 1962) a politician, Mayor of Balestrand before and after WWII
 Trygve Heltveit (1913 in Balestrand – 1985) a Norwegian philologist.

See also
List of former municipalities of Norway

References

External links

Municipal fact sheet from Statistics Norway 
Official Website of Balestrand 
Kviknes Hotel

 
Sogndal
Former municipalities of Norway
1850 establishments in Norway
2020 disestablishments in Norway